Soluk Bon-e Sofla (also Romanized as Solūk Bon-e Soflá; also known as Solūkbon and Solūk Bon-e Pā’īn) is a village in Shuil Rural District, Rahimabad District, Rudsar County, Gilan Province, Iran. At the 2006 census, its population was 45, in 14 families.

References 

Populated places in Rudsar County